Olivia Margareta Eliasson (born 7 June 1996) is a Swedish singer.

Eliasson was discovered when she did a cover of the song "Begging" by singer Anton Ewald and posted it on YouTube. Ewald contacted her after watching the video and they did a duet of the song "Human" together.

Olivia Eliasson competed in Melodifestivalen 2018 with the song ”Never Learn”. In the fourth semifinal she made it to the Second Chance round where she was in a duel and lost to Renaida.

Singles

References 

1996 births
Living people
21st-century Swedish singers
21st-century Swedish women singers
Melodifestivalen contestants of 2018